Ingeborg Markgraf-Dannenberg (18 March 1911 – 22 March 1996) was a Swiss naturalist, botanist, taxonomist, and teacher noted for her work at the Institute for Systematic Botany at the University of Zurich, in particular her work classifying the genus Festuca.  She described over 120 species, and the grass Festuca markgrafiae was named in her honor.    

She was born in Berlin, and was married to the botanist Friedrich Markgraf. She died in Zürich, aged 85.

References 

 1911 births
 1996 deaths
 Swiss women scientists
20th-century Swiss botanists
20th-century women scientists
Women botanists
Scientists from Berlin